Josephine Reynolds (born 28 March 1965) has been described as one of the first full-time female firefighters in the UK. (However, Sue Batten is the first full time female firefighter. she was 30 when she joined the London Fire Brigade in May 1982; she retired in September 2007 after 25 years of service.)

Reynolds grew up in Narberth, Pembrokeshire, before moving to Norfolk to live with her father.

She left school aged 16, and in 1982 she was accepted on a new training scheme with the Norfolk Fire and Rescue Service aimed at school leavers. After a year of training, she began working with the fire and rescue service in Norfolk in 1983, aged 18.  She worked at the fire station in Thetford. Three years later she qualified to drive a fire engine.

After four years, she married a fellow fireman, and they both left to travel.

Reynolds published an autobiography, Fire Woman: The Extraordinary Story of Britain's First Female Firefighter, in 2017.

References 

Women in firefighting
British firefighters
Living people
1965 births
People from Pembrokeshire